Etazolate (SQ-20,009, EHT-0202) is an anxiolytic drug which is a pyrazolopyridine derivative and has unique pharmacological properties. It acts as a positive allosteric modulator of the GABAA receptor at the barbiturate binding site, as an adenosine antagonist of the A1 and A2 subtypes, and as a phosphodiesterase inhibitor selective for the PDE4 isoform. It is currently in clinical trials for the treatment of Alzheimer's disease.

Synthesis

See also 
 Cartazolate
 ICI-190,622
 Tracazolate

References 

Anxiolytics
Pyrazolopyridines
Hydrazones
PDE4 inhibitors
Ethyl esters
GABAA receptor positive allosteric modulators
Adenosine receptor antagonists